A partial solar eclipse occurred at the Moon's descending node of the orbit on Sunday, May 11, 1975. A solar eclipse occurs when the Moon passes between Earth and the Sun, thereby totally or partly obscuring the image of the Sun for a viewer on Earth. A partial solar eclipse occurs in the polar regions of the Earth when the center of the Moon's shadow misses the Earth.

Related eclipses

Eclipses in 1975 
 A partial solar eclipse on Sunday, 11 May 1975.
 A total lunar eclipse on Sunday, 25 May 1975.
 A partial solar eclipse on Monday, 3 November 1975.
 A total lunar eclipse on Tuesday, 18 November 1975.

Solar eclipses of 1975–1978

Saros 118 

It is a part of Saros cycle 118, repeating every 18 years, 11 days, containing 72 events. The series started with partial solar eclipse on May 24, 803 AD. It contains total eclipses from August 19, 947 AD through October 25, 1650, hybrid eclipses on November 4, 1668 and November 15, 1686, and annular eclipses from November 27, 1704 through April 30, 1957. The series ends at member 72 as a partial eclipse on July 15, 2083. The longest duration of total was 6 minutes, 59 seconds on May 16, 1398.

Metonic cycle

References

External links 

 TimeAndDate.com: May 11, 1975 Partial Solar Eclipse appearance

 Preliminary results of observations of the solar eclipse of May 11, 1975 (Russian report)
 Partial Eclipse of the Sun: 1975 May 11 HM Nautical Almanac Office

1975 5 11
1975 in science
1975 5 11
May 1975 events